The 2006 Thurrock Council election took place on 4 May 2006 to elect members of Thurrock Council in Essex, England. One third of the council was up for election and the Conservative party stayed in overall control of the council.

After the election, the composition of the council was
Conservative 26
Labour 21
Independent 2

Election result
The results saw Labour gain one seat from the Conservatives in West Thurrock and South Stifford ward where the British National Party pushed the Conservatives into third place. However the Conservatives held the other 7 seats they were defending and as a result maintained an overall majority of 3 on the council.

Ward results

References

2006
2006 English local elections
2000s in Essex